NCDS may refer to:
 Nabakrushna Choudhury Centre for Development Studies (NCDS), Bhubaneswar, think-tank of the Government of Odisha
 National Child Development Study, a longitudinal study in Great Britain
 Nortel Certifications